Nikola Stojanović may refer to:

 Nikola Stojanović (footballer, born 1983), Macedonian football defender
 Nikola Stojanović (footballer, born 1995), Serbian football midfielder and forward